Cooper High School is a public high school located in Cooper, Texas (USA) and classified as a 2A school by the UIL. It is part of the Cooper Independent School District located in central Delta County. In 2016, the school was rated "Met Standard" by the Texas Education Agency.

Athletics
The Cooper Bulldogs compete in the following sports 

Baseball
Basketball
Cross Country
Football
Golf
Powerlifting
Softball
Tennis
Track and Field

State titles
Baseball 
1999(2A)
Girls Basketball 
1958(1A), 1960(1A), 1977(1A)
Boys Golf 
1985(2A)
One Act Play 
1988(2A)

Notable alumni
Bam Morris, former professional football player

References

External links
Cooper ISD

Public high schools in Texas
Education in Delta County, Texas